Biblical Archaeology Review is a magazine appearing every three months and sometimes referred to as BAR that seeks to connect the academic study of archaeology to a broad general audience seeking to understand the world of the Bible, the Near East, and the Middle East (Syro-Palestine and the Levant). Since its first issue in 1975, Biblical Archaeology Review has covered the latest discoveries and controversies in the archaeology of Israel, Turkey, Jordan and the surrounding regions as well as the newest scholarly insights into both the Hebrew Bible and the New Testament. The magazine is published by the nonsectarian and nonprofit Biblical Archaeology Society (BAS).

Sister publications
Bible Review was also published by BAS from 1985 to 2005, with the goal of communicating the academic study of the Bible to a broad general audience. Covering both the Old and New Testaments, Bible Review presented critical and historical interpretations of biblical texts, and "reader-friendly Biblical scholarship". After 2005, Bible Review merged into BAR.

Archaeology Odyssey was published from 1997 to 2005.

Online access
The full runs of both Bible Review and Archaeology Odyssey, plus every issue of BAR since 1975, are available to Biblical Archaeology Society All Access Members in the BAS Library.

Editors-in-chief
From its founding in 1975 until 2017, the editor-in-chief was Hershel Shanks. After Shanks' retirement at the end of 2017, Robert R. Cargill was selected as the next editor. Cargill stepped down in March 2021 and was replaced by Glenn J. Corbett.

 Hershel Shanks (1975–2018)
 Robert R. Cargill (2018–2021)
 Glenn J. Corbett (since 2021)

Publishers
 Hershel Shanks (1975–2003)
 Susan Laden (since 2004)

References

External links

The Biblical Archaeology Society's homepage and daily blog, Bible History Daily
Bible Review

1975 establishments in Washington, D.C.
Quarterly magazines published in the United States
Archaeology magazines
Biblical archaeology
Magazines established in 1975
Magazines published in Washington, D.C.